is a former Nippon Professional Baseball infielder.

External links

1954 births
Living people
Baseball people from Nara Prefecture
Japanese baseball players
Nippon Professional Baseball infielders
Nippon Ham Fighters players
Hiroshima Toyo Carp players
Japanese baseball coaches
Nippon Professional Baseball coaches